Abdi Kassim (born October 19, 1984 in Zanzibar) is a footballer from Tanzania.

International career
Also known as BABI or sometime Ballack of unguja, Kassim was the first player to score a goal in Tanzania's new stadium in Dar es Salaam, the Benjamin Mkapa National Stadium, in a friendly match against Uganda to mark the official opening of the venue. The stadium was built by the Chinese Government in collaboration with the Tanzania government.

Kassim is noted for his long range shooting ability. He favours his left foot.

On 4 January 2011, Yanga and Tanzanian national team midfielder Abdi Kassim has signed a two-year contract with a Vietnamese club, Đồng Tâm Long An.
.

References

 

1984 births
Living people
Zanzibari people
Tanzanian footballers
Tanzania international footballers
Dual internationalists (football)
Tanzanian expatriate footballers
Expatriate footballers in Vietnam
Tanzanian expatriate sportspeople in Vietnam
Expatriate footballers in Malaysia
Tanzanian expatriate sportspeople in Malaysia
Association football forwards
Mtibwa Sugar F.C. players
Young Africans S.C. players
Azam F.C. players
UiTM FC players
Tanzanian Premier League players